AV MAX is a special-interest audiophile magazine owned by Network18 Publishing, which is in turn a Network18 division. Based in Mumbai, the magazine is distributed across India and certain South-East Asian cities. Since June 2008, the Editor of the magazine is Swapnil Raje.

Established in December 1999, the magazine focuses on reviewing high-end audio-video equipment like amplifiers, stereos, floor-standing speakers and related news. The magazine also publishes content on music reviews, Blu-ray/DVD reviews and music events and profiles. The magazine caters to audiophiles or AV enthusiasts and the B2B communities alike.

The magazine is an independent, self-styled content that has with its in-depth product reviews, have won a strong readership across the country. The magazine has a panel of in-house engineering experts and also collaborates with experts from select streams of the market. Also, equipped with a state-of-the-art AV studio in the office, the magazine provides the reader with detailed unbiased reviews, sharp product shots and fresh insights into the market.

In October 2010, the magazine was redesigned and restructured. In January 2013, in-line with the redesign, the price of the magazine has gone up from Rs 75 to Rs 100 that reflects AV MAX’s interest in giving more to the reader. Stated Sandeep Khosla, CEO, Infomedia18, about the redesign, "The new cover design is a lot more open, without borders and the new AV Max logo is taller and leaner, because of which it can be noticed in a crowd of magazines; the cover, too, has a premium look. The new cover design also allows us to showcase more stories on the cover, informing the reader that there is a whole lot to be read in the magazine."

Recently, 'AV MAX' completed 13 years and came out with a special "Anniversary Special" issue in January 2013.

History 
The previous editor of AV MAX was Nishant Padhiar went on to become the editor of the men's gadget magazine, T3. He left Infomedia18 in 2008 to become the editor of UK based magazine called What Hi-Fi (India) and Stuff, owned by the Haymarket Media Group, UK.

AV MAX Expo 
AV MAX also initiated an Audio-Video (AV) Expo dedicated showcasing event for Audiophiles and Home-Entertainment/Hi-Fi enthusiasts. In the expo, leading players like Bose, Bowers & Wilkins, Onkyo, Denon, Thiel, Definitive Technology, Yamaha and more than 200 brands display their wide array of latest products. They are the first ones to introduce the concept of ‘demo rooms’ in AV MAX Expo wherein the consumer gets to touch, feel and experience these products.

Initiated in January 2002, so far AV MAX has conducted nine successful AV Expos in India with the latest one – AV MAX EXPO 2013 – soon to be held at Delhi during 8–10 March 2013.

The first of its kind AV MAX Expo was held at Taj Lands End on 18 January 2002 and witnessed a strong crowd of 40,000. Second AV MAX Expo was successfully held at Le Meridien, Bangalore during 20–22 June 2003. Some of the famous brand names that participated and made the expo a success were Tannoy, Epson, Bose, Toshiba, Designer Audio, Quad, Sonodyne etc. In the same year, another expo was held in Mumbai followed by similar events in 2004 (Chennai), January 2005 (This was in MBD Radisson Hotel in Noida New Delhi), July 2005 (Mumbai), September 2006 (Ahmedabad), December 2007 (Chennai)]. Further there was av expo in Pragati Maidan, New Delhi in February 2008.

Best of AV MAX 
Every year, AV MAX selects the best products from 35 categories reviewed through the previous year. While half of the awards are dedicated to AV products, the second half of the selection focuses on 9 categories of music and DVD. The 'Best Of' special feature is usually revealed in January of each year.

AV MAX on Magzter 
Latest copies of AV MAX monthly magazine  in digital format are now available on Magzter. Currently, copies from July 2012 to January 2013 are available here.

References

 Forbes In Sep'09 
 Business.in on Lata Mangeshkar's 80th Birthday 
 AV MAX reviews published in Smart Buy 
 AV MAX Glossary in SB 
 themusicmagazine 
 consumerdaddy 
 Bestmediainfo Announces AV MAX Redesign [* 
 Adgully Reviews AV MAX Redesign Adgully Reviews AV MAX Redesign
 Sandeep Khosla discusses redesign following AV MAX's 10th anniversary.

External links

 10th Anniversary of AV MAX Magazine
 AV MAX On Infomedia18 website
 Official Network18 website
 Official Network18 website 
 Forbes publishes AV MAX special feature 'Budget Setups' (August 2009)
 Chip magazine discusses AV MAX
 FX Entertainment to download AV MAX reviews
 Samsung Reviewed
 AV MAX Reviews Norge
 Sonodyne Avant reviewed by AV MAX in January 2006
 Sonodyne Sonus 2605 reviewed by AV MAX in September 2003
 Sonodyne Genie Cine Pack reviewed by AV MAX in November 2001
 Brief history of AV MAX
 AV MAX reviewer, Karan Gour's review published in SmartBuy
 Cowon S9 Media Player PDF reviewed in AV MAX
 Media Player, Cowon S9 reviewed by Karan Gour, AV MAX, published in SmartBuy (Business Line)
 AV MAX special feature on hi-end Car Audio (Jan2009) published in SmartBuy (Business Line)
 Thiel Audio CS3.7 by reviewer Sumit Bhosle published in AV MAX on February 2009

1999 establishments in Maharashtra
Business magazines published in India
Monthly magazines published in India
Magazines established in 1999
Mass media in Mumbai
Professional and trade magazines